BR-116 is a federal route of highways of Brazil and the longest highway in the country, with  of extension. The road connect Fortaleza, Ceará, one of the largest Northeast Brazil metropolises, to the southern city of Jaguarão, Rio Grande do Sul, in the border with Uruguay. It is also the longest highway in the country to be completely paved. It is considered one of the most important highways in the country, along with BR-101.

Route description
BR-116 runs in a north-south direction, close to, but not on Brazil's coastline. It is the second longest highway in the country and, by connecting major urban centers including Fortaleza, São Paulo, Rio de Janeiro, Curitiba and Porto Alegre, arguably the most important and busiest Brazilian highway. Numerous stretches of BR-116 highway have other official names.

The highway is especially busy along the Curitiba—São Paulo—Rio de Janeiro section. The Curitiba–São Paulo section–officially known as the Régis Bittencourt Highway (Rodovia Régis Bittencourt)–is nicknamed the "Highway of Death" ("Rodovia da Morte") due to its many weather-related accidents. The São Paulo—Rio de Janeiro section is officially named President Dutra Highway (Rodovia Presidente Dutra) and is the busiest section of BR-116, running into or close to 15 cities with over 200,000 inhabitants. The section between Novo Hamburgo and Porto Alegre is also heavily trafficked, and there is a strong movement of cargo between Porto Alegre and the Port of Rio Grande, in Pelotas.

Major cities directly served by BR-116 highway are: Fortaleza, Salgueiro, Feira de Santana, Vitória da Conquista, Teófilo Otoni, Governador Valadares, Rio de Janeiro, Volta Redonda, São José dos Campos, São Paulo, Curitiba, Lages, Caxias do Sul, Canoas, Porto Alegre, Pelotas.

Duplications

In the southern region of the country, the highway is duplicated in the 70 km between Guaíba, Porto Alegre and Novo Hamburgo. The 211 km between Guaíba and Pelotas is currently doubling. In November 2022, there were already 148 km duplicated and delivered on this section.  There is also a small duplicate section between Curitiba and Mandirituba, towards the state of Santa Catarina.

In the Southeast Region of the country, the highway is doubled in the 400 km between Curitiba and São Paulo, where it's called Rodovia Régis Bittencourt (almost all duplicated around the year 2000, the last stretch in the mountains was only completed in 2017), and in the 410 km between São Paulo and Rio de Janeiro, where it's called Rodovia Presidente Dutra (doubled in 1967, it is the most important highway in the country, connecting the 2 largest cities). The connection between Rio de Janeiro and Guapimirim has also been doubled since 1980.

In the Northeast Region of the country, the highway is duplicated in the 76 km between Feira de Santana and Argoim, in Bahia, and in some parts near Fortaleza, Ceará.

Privatizations 
On March 1, 1996, the stretch of highway between the cities of São Paulo and Rio de Janeiro, known as the Rodovia Presidente Dutra, was granted to private companies, with the CCR Nova Dutra company being the current administrator. On the same day, a 144 kilometer section between the cities of Duque de Caxias and Sapucaia was granted to a company named CRT.

Gallery

See also 
 BR-101

References 

Federal highways in Brazil